An A-Z list of settlements in Turkmenistan. For a list of the main cities and towns see the list of cities in Turkmenistan.

List

Adzhi 
Adzhikui 
Adzhiyab 
Agar 
Ahal 
Ak 
Ak-Altyn 
Ak-Bay 
Akbogaz 
Ak-Bulak 
Akdash 
Ak-Dashayak 
Akdepe 
Ak-Gaudan 
Akhchadepe 
Akhchaguyma 
Akhtash-Ovliya 
Akkala
Ak-Kaya
Ak-Kum 
Akkumulyam 
Ak-Kungur 
Ak-Kuyu
Ak-Mechet
Akrabat
Ak-Rabat 
Ak-Say 
Ak-Tepe 
Ak-Teri 
Ak-Tugay 
Ak’yayla 
Aladzha 
Alla-Sakal 
Allatepe 
Almysh 
Alnysh 
Alpan 
Alyandor
Aman
Aman Bai 
Amandor 
Amannazar 
Amansha 
Amansha-Kapan 
Ammanazar 
Amu-Dar’inskiy 
Amu-Dar’inskiy 
Amu-Dar’ya 
Angat
Annamurat
Annau 
Arab
Arab-Kala 
Arab-Khana 
Araki 
Arap 
Arapchuk 
Arapkhana 
Archangān 
Archin
Archin 
Archin’yak 
Archman 
Arpaklen
Artyk 
Arychagyl 
Arykagyl 
Ashgabat 
Ashgabat 
Astanababa 
Ata 
Ata
Atatlyk 
Ata-Yab
Aul Geok-Che 
Aul Nomer Pyat’desyat Vtoroy 
Aul Nomer Shestoy
Aul Urazaly 
Auliye
Avchi 
Ayak 
Aydere
Aydin 
Aýrybaba 
Babadaýhan 
Babadaykhan 
Babadurmaz
Babakhodzha 
Babarabkala 
Bagadzha 
Bagarka 
Bagt 
Bäherden 
Bakhshi 
Bakhshimarish
Balkan 
Balla-Ishem 
Bamy 
Bangil’dy 
Banysh 
Baragiz 
Bardzan
Barsli 
Basaga 
Bashbeden 
Bashir 
Bashir 
Bashvak
Bassar-Kish 
Batash 
Batyrkent 
Bay 
Bayat 
Bayat-Khadzhi 
Baygushli 
Bay-Kabyl’ 
Bay-Kishlak 
Baýramaly 
Bayramtogan 
Bazar 
Bazardepe 
Bazar-Sakhe 
Bedeň 
Begi-Sakar 
Bekdash 
Bekuri 
Belek-Turkmenskiy 
Bendesen 
Bere 
Bereket 
Berenchi-Kara-Yab
Beriket 
Besheur 
Besheuray 
Beuradzhi 
Beurme 
Bikebend 
Bikuri 
Birinchiboy 
Birinchi-Chandyr 
Birleshik Pervyy 
Bitik
Bki 
Bokurdak 
Boroshly 
Bosaga 
Bovart 
Boy Pervyy 
Boydag 
Bozogoli 
Budzhak 
Bugdayly 
Bulak 
Burdalyk
 
Burguchi 
Burk 
Buyrabab 
Büzmeyin 
Byr-Koz 
Byurgyutli 
Chaacha 
Chagali 
Chagpata 
Chagyl 
Chagyl 
Chakal 
Chakich 
Chakmaklychanga 
Chakyr 
Chalapkuyu 
Chaloyuk 
Chalsu 
Chaltut 
Chalysh 
Chamchakly 
Chärjew 
Charkh Āb 
Charshanga
Chartma 
Charvadar 
Charvak 
Charvan-Kala 
Charyy 
Chash 
Chash-Kala 
Chashkent 
Chashkent 
Chat 
Chāt 
Chatli 
Chatrak 
Chatryak 
Chaudur 
Chegez 
Chekich 
Chekich 
Chekishler 
Chekmen 
Chekur-Yurt 
Cheleken 
Cheltek 
Chemche 
Chemeli 
Chemenibit 
Chenen 
Chepek 
Cherenga 
Cherkez 
Cherkezli 
Cheshme 
Cheshme Vtoroy 
Chil’gez 
Choganly 
Chukurkala 
Chukur-Kala 
Chuli 
Chungurli 
Chupli 
Churga 
Dada-Ogly 
Dadedogli 
Dagadzhik 
Dagarkishlak 
Dag-Sakhkary 
Damzak 
Danata 
Dāneshmand 
Danisher 
Dardali 
Dargana 
Darganata 
Dargan-Ata 
Darvaza 
Dashhowuz 
Dasharvat
Dashkuduk 
Dashowuz 
Daulet 
Dautly 
Davlet 
Dayakhatyn 
Dayne 
Daz 
Dekel’-Dash 
Denglikopry 
Dervezekem 
Desht 
Deycha 
Deynau 
Dostluk 
Dou-Kala 
Doyran 
Dukdrushtum 
Durdy 
Durdykhan 
Durun 
Durun 
Durun 
Dushak 
Duunchi 
Duzlydepe 
Duzlyolum 
Dvadtsatiletiye Turkmenskoy Sovetskoy Sotsialisticheskoy Respubliki 
Dyuyeboyun 
Dzhafar 
Dzhanakhir 
Dzhapar 
Dzhar-Guzar 
Dzhebel 
Dzhedzhirs 
Dzhengel’ 
Dzhigerbent 
Dzhingilkhatab
Dzhity-Kuduk 
Dzhoyruk 
Dzhuma 
Dzhuma-Bazar 
Dzhuppy 
Dzhuvaldy 
Edrug 
Egri-Guzar 
Egriyagyr 
Energetik 
Epo 
Erdel’ 
Esenguly 
Esenmengli 
Eski 
Eski-Narazym 
Espatkī 
Etbashi 
Farab-Pristan’ 
Farap 
Firyuza 
Gabakly 
Gaburdy 
Gadyn 
Garabogazköl 
Garagum 
Garagum Canal 
Garrychyrla 
Garrygala 
Gaudan 
Gazanjyk 
Gazojak 
Gekcha 
Gazanaryk
Gëksay 
Geok-Tepe Nomer Pervyy 
Geok-Tepe Nomer Tretiy 
Gepchak 
Germob 
Gevers 
Geyn-Keriz 
Gil’-Abad 
Gindukush 
Gokcha 
Gökdepe 
Goklenkuyu 
Golovnoye 
Gorel’de 
Goturdepe 
Gowurdak 
Grodekovskiy 
Gudriolum 
Gugerdzhengli 
Gulastan 
Gumdag 
Gunesh 
Gurumsay 
Gurum-Say 
Gushgy 
Guzalkent 
Gyami 
Gyaur 
Gyaur 
Gyurmush-Tepe 
Gyzylarbat 
Gyzyletrek 
Gyzylgaya 
Halach 
Hanhowuz 
Ḩātem Qal‘eh 
Hauz Hanskoje Vodohranilisce 
Il’chik 
Ilen 
Ilidzha 
Iljik 
Il’mak 
Ilyach 
Ilyari 
Imambaba 
Imeni Andreyeva 
Imeni Andreyeva 
Imeni Andreyeva 
Imeni Andreyeva 
Imeni Andreyeva 
Imeni Budënnogo 
Imeni Budënnogo 
Imeni Chapayeva 
Imeni Chapayeva 
Imeni Chkalova 
Imeni Chkalova 
Imeni Chubina 
Imeni Dimitrova 
Imeni Dimitrova 
Imeni Dvadtsati Shesti Bakinskikh Komissarov 
Imeni Dvadtsati Shesti Bakinskikh Komissarov 
Imeni Dzerzhinskogo 
Imeni Engel’sa 
Imeni Engel’sa 
Imeni Gorel’de 
Imeni Gorel’de 
Imeni Gor’kogo 
Imeni Gor’kogo 
Imeni Il’icha 
Imeni Kaganovicha 
Imeni Kaganovicha 
Imeni Kaganovicha 
Imeni Kaganovicha 
Imeni Kalinina 
Imeni Kalinina 
Imeni Kalinina 
Imeni Kalinina 
Imeni Kalinina 
Imeni Kalinina 
Imeni Kalinina 
Imeni Kalinina 
Imeni Kalinina 
Imeni Kalinina 
Imeni Kalinina 
Imeni Kalinina 
Imeni Kalinina 
Imeni Kalinina 
Imeni Kalinina 
Imeni Karla Marksa 
Imeni Karla Marksa 
Imeni Karla Marksa 
Imeni Karla Marksa 
Imeni Karla Marksa 
Imeni Karla Marksa 
Imeni Karla Marksa 
Imeni Kirova 
Imeni Kirova 
Imeni Kirova 
Imeni Kirova 
Imeni Kirova 
Imeni Kirova 
Imeni Kirova 
Imeni Kirova 
Imeni Komsomola 
Imeni Kuybysheva 
Imeni Kuybysheva 
Imeni Kuybysheva 
Imeni Kuybysheva 
Imeni Kuybysheva 
Imeni Kuybysheva 
Imeni Lenina 
Imeni Lenina 
Imeni Lenina 
Imeni Lenina 
Imeni Lenina 
Imeni Lenina 
Imeni Lenina 
Imeni Lenina 
Imeni Lenina 
Imeni Lenina 
Imeni Lenina 
Imeni Lenina 
Imeni Lenina 
Imeni Lenina 
Imeni Lenina 
Imeni Lenina 
Imeni Lenina 
Imeni Maksima Gor’kogo 
Imeni Malenkova 
Imeni Malenkova 
Imeni Malenkova 
Imeni Malenkova 
Imeni Malenkova 
Imeni Mikoyana 
Imeni Mikoyana 
Imeni Molotova 
Imeni Molotova 
Imeni Molotova 
Imeni Molotova 
Imeni Molotova 
Imeni Molotova 
Imeni Molotova 
Imeni Molotova 
Imeni Molotova 
Imeni Molotova 
Imeni Molotova 
Imeni Molotova 
Imeni Molotova 
Imeni Ordzhonikidze 
Imeni Ovezberdy Kuliyeva 
Imeni Poltoratskogo 
Imeni Revolyutsii 
Imeni Shvernika 
Imeni Stakhanova 
Imeni Stakhanova 
Imeni Stakhanova 
Imeni Stalina 
Imeni Stalina 
Imeni Stalina 
Imeni Stalina 
Imeni Stalina 
Imeni Stalina 
Imeni Stalina 
Imeni Stalina 
Imeni Stalina 
Imeni Stalina 
Imeni Stalina 
Imeni Stalina 
Imeni Stalina 
Imeni Stalina 
Imeni Stalina 
Imeni Stalina 
Imeni Stalina 
Imeni Stalina 
Imeni Tel’mana 
Imeni Tel’mana 
Imeni Tel’mana 
Imeni Tel’mana 
Imeni Voroshilova 
Imeni Voroshilova 
Imeni Voroshilova 
Imeni Voroshilova 
Imeni Voroshilova 
Imeni Voroshilova 
Imeni Voroshilova 
Imeni Voroshilova 
Imeni Voroshilova 
Imeni Voroshilova 
Imeni Voroshilova 
Imeni Voroshilova 
Imeni Vyshinskogo 
Imeni Zhdanova 
Imeni Zhdanova 
Imeni Zhdanova 
Imeni Zhdanova 
Imeni Zhdanova 
Imeni Zhdanova 
Inkylap 
Inkylap 
Inkylap 
Internatsional 
Internatsional 
Internatsional 
Internatsional 
Intush 
Irkli 
Isamli 
Ishik-Bay 
Iskra 
Iskra 
Islim-Cheshme 
Ispas 
Isrikkala 
Itbash 
Izgant 
Jangnga 
Kabasakal 
Kabyl 
Kaka 
Kala 
Kala-I-Mor 
Kalankui 
Kalinin 
Kalininskiy 
Kalyam 
Kamyshdzhik 
Kanav 
Kandak 
Kanshar 
Kapakly 
Kaplanli 
Karaadzhi 
Kara-Agach 
Kara-Agach 
Karaaygyr 
Karaba-Akhun 
Karabagadzhe 
Karabakshi 
Kara-Bashlyk 
Karabekaul 
Kara-Bogaz Gol 
Kara-Boyen 
Kara-Bulak 
Kara-Chapan 
Kara-Chep 
Karadashli 
Karadegish 
Karadepe 
Karadzha 
Karadzha 
Karadzhary 
Kara-Dzhin 
Karagan 
Karagël’ 
Karagëz 
Kara-Govok 
Kara-Kala 
Kara-Ker 
Karakhan 
Karakhodzha 
Karakhodzha 
Karakongur 
Karakul’ 
Kara-Kuli 
Karamakhmud 
Karaman Pervyy 
Karaman Vtoroy 
Karamet-Niyaz 
Karamysh 
Kara-Nuri 
Karaparsan 
Kararyk 
Karasengir 
Kara-Sukut 
Karatamak 
Karategyan 
Kara-Tepe 
Karaul 
Karaul 
Karaulak 
Karauldepe 
Karaul-Kuyu 
Kara-Vakil’ Pervyy 
Kara-Vakil’ Vtoroy 
Kara-Yab Pervyy 
Kara-Yab Tretiy 
Kara-Yab Vtoroy 
Karkin 
Karkin 
Karkinadzhi 
Karlyuk 
Karnas 
Karnas 
Karnas 
Karry Bent 
Karry-Cherlya 
Karshi 
Kary-Khodzha-Ata 
Kashgarskiy 
Kata-kara-Tut 
Katta-Sopiyab 
Kaushek-Kyzyltakyr 
Kaushut 
Kausy 
Kayli 
Kayrayuz 
Kazandzhi 
Kazgankala 
Kazy 
Kazylyar 
Kel’-Bash 
Keleli Vtoroy 
Kelif 
Kel’teshor 
Kelyadzhi 
Kelyata 
Kelyazyar 
Kemir 
Kendikli 
Kënekesir 
Kepekli 
Kergochemen 
Kerki 
Kerki-Aryk 
Kerkichi 
Kert-Yakha 
Keseklik 
Keshi 
Keske 
Kessyr 
Keyikkodana 
Khalil’-Bukry 
Khalyal’chilim 
Khamay 
Khandak 
Khandak 
Khandakli 
Khankui 
Khan-Kyariz 
Khar-Bala 
Khasar-Kala 
Khasyn 
Khatab 
Khatab 
Khaz 
Kheleulen 
Khellen 
Khelţābād 
Khilak 
Khivabad 
Khodzha-Ali 
Khodzha-Bulan 
Khodzhaguyma 
Khodzhai-Fil’ata 
Khodzha-Irat 
Khodzhakala 
Khodzhakala 
Khodzhakala 
Khodzhakala 
Khodzhakaraul 
Khodzha-Karaul 
Khodzha-Kenepsi 
Khodzha-Kishlak 
Khodzhakumbet 
Khodzhali 
Khodzhali 
Khodzhambas 
Khodzhameshed 
Khodzha-Mrasan 
Khodzhaolen 
Khodzhara 
Khodzhasu 
Khorodzhokh-Kala 
Khoudandzhik 
Khozarek 
Khudayberdy 
Khudayberdy 
Khudzhum 
Khurmat-Kala 
Kianly 
Kichiga Pervaya 
Kichiga Vtoraya 
Kiikchi 
Kirpichli 
Kirpili 
Kishtivan 
Kizyl-Ayak 
Kizyl-Cherek 
Kizyl-Ishchi 
Kizyl-Kemer 
Kizyl-Murad 
Kizyl-Oktyabr’ 
Kizyl-Su 
Kizyl-Turkmenistan 
Koch-Kor 
Kodzha 
Kokmiyar 
Kolodets Attadzhan 
Kolodets Babazardadazh 
Kommuna 
Kommuna 
Kommuna 
Kommunist 
Kommunist 
Kommunizm 
Kommunizm 
Kommunizm 
Kommunizm 
Kommunizm 
Kommunizm 
Kommunizm 
Kommunizm 
Komsomol 
Komsomol 
Komsomol 
Komsomol’sk 
Kone-Borme 
Köneürgench 
Kopak-Chalak 
Kordzhou 
Koshagyr 
Koshakak 
Koshakaudan 
Koshanda 
Koshkin 
Koshoba 
Koshtemir 
Koyno-Kumbez 
Kozelkovskiy 
Kozhe 
Krach 
Kranch 
Krasnovodskiy Zaliv 
Krasnovodskiy Zapovednik 
Krasnowodsk 
Krasnoye Znamya 
Krasnoye Zunamya 
Krasnyy Oktyabr’ 
Krasnyy Turkmenistan 
Krestovskiy 
Kruchay 
Kuchuk 
Kūh-e Rīzeh 
Kui-Dzhuk 
Kulanbay 
Kulandag 
Kulandzhi 
Kularyk 
Kulayanchi 
Kul’dzha 
Kul’tura 
Kul’tura 
Kum-Pete 
Kundzhak 
Kunya-Yarmysh 
Kupakli 
Kuraish 
Kuraish 
Kurbanek 
Kurbanseyid 
Kurdzhukly 
Kurtli 
Kuruksay 
Kuruzhdey 
Kushbegi 
Kushchi 
Kushchi 
Kushka 
Kuuli-Mayak 
Kuvak 
Kuylyar 
Kuylyar 
Kuyzeshour 
Kyal’-Ata 
Kyal’tayab 
Kyal’tayab 
Kyamtor 
Kyasauli-Kala 
Kyrkkui 
Kyrkuyli 
Kyurenkala 
Kyzyl 
Kyzylbayda 
Kyzylbaydak 
Kyzylbaydak 
Kyzylcharva 
Kyzyl-Cheshme
Kyzyl-Daykhan
Kyzylgar 
Kyzyl-Guch 
Kyzylgyuych 
Kyzylimam 
Kyzylkasyl 
Kyzylkoshun 
Kyzylkumbet 
Kyzylkup 
Kyzylpildyz 
Kyzyl-Sakal 
Kyzylshark 
Kyzyltayak 
Kyzylyyldyz 
Lambe 
Lavak 
Lebap 
Lebap 
Leningrad 
Leningrad 
Leningrad 
Leninsk 
Loţfābād 
Madau 
Magarif 
Mahalla-i-Saā 
Makhmaldepe 
Makhmud-Adzhi 
Makhtum-Kala
Makhtym-Kala 
Malay-Adzhi 
Mallarchilyk 
Mamash 
Mamatay 
Mamed’yar 
Mamur 
Manysh 
Maraniyat 
Marat 
Martazi 
Mary 
Mary 
Megadzhik 
Megin 
Mekan 
Mekhinli 
Mekrub 
Meshkhed 
Miana 
Mīr Qal‘eh 
Miradzhi 
Mirzabek 
Mirzachirla 
Mollakara 
Monchakly 
Monzhukly 
Monzhukly 
Moor 
Morgunovskiy 
Moskovsk 
Moskva 
Moskva 
Moskva 
Moskva 
Moskva 
Moskva 
Moskva 
Moyak 
Moyak-Olum 
Mugal-Bala 
Mukry 
Mukry 
Mukry 
Muminchandyr 
Murcha 
Murgab 
Murgap Deryasy 
Naara 
Narazym 
Nauruz-Abad 
Nebitdag 
Nevtonovskiy 
Niyazdepe 
Nogarli 
Nokhur 
Nova 
Nugri 
Nugunek 
Nuradzhi 
Nurali 
Nurata 
Oba 
Oboy 
Odzharly 
Ogar 
Oglamysh 
Oglanly 
Oglanly 
Ogomana 
Ogurchinskiy 
Okarem 
Oktyabr’ 
Oktyabr’ 
Oktyabr’sk 
Oktyabr’sk 
Okuzbulak 
Omar 
Omarata 
Omar-Khodzha 
Omchali 
Omchali 
On-Begi 
Onbirikzhi 
Orazkël’ 
Ordy-Khodzha 
Orfa 
Ovaz-Dzhalatay 
Pakmaksuidzhi 
Parmasha 
Parou 
Pashtion 
Permet 
Pervogo Maya 
Pervomayskiy 
Pervyy Khodzhakuyu 
Pioner 
Pioner 
Pioner 
Pioner 
Pioner 
Pobeda 
Pobeda 
Pogranichnik 
Polisultan 
Poltavskiy 
Porseh Sū-ye Soflá 
Pravda 
Prokhladnoye 
Purnuar 
Put’ Lenina 
Qareh Tekān 
Rabat-Kashan 
Rabochiy 
Ravnina 
Repetek 
Rodnik Samuk-Su 
Romazak 
Ruzumbay 
Sabbuny 
Sadyvar 
Sakar 
Sakar-Adzhi 
Sakarchaga 
Sakar-Chaga 
Salmiin 
Sandykgachy 
Sang Dīvār 
Sansy 
Sapardar 
Saragt 
Sary-Bash 
Sarydag-Tugay 
Sarydepe 
Sarygamysh Köli 
Sarygurum 
Sarykbala 
Sarykel’ 
Sary-Yazy 
Sayat 
Sayat 
Sayat 
Sayat 
Sayat 
Sayvan 
Sayvatur 
Sazandy 
Segli-Kar 
Sekizatlyk 
Sernyy Zavod 
Severnykh Promyslov Ozera Nomera Shestogo (Number 6)
Severnyy Chelekenskiy Zaliv 
Seydi 
Shagal 
Shagatly  
Shakhmurad 
Shambebazar 
Shamurad-Dzhinkul’ 
Sharlawuk 
Shatlyk 
Shekh-Bala 
Shemli 
Sheykh 
Sheykharyk 
Shikh 
Shikh 
Shikhzyab 
Shik-Kala 
Shirlama 
Shor 
Shor-Aryk 
Shor-Cheshme 
Shori-Payan 
Shor-Kala 
Shor-Khaudan 
Shura 
Shurvogaz 
Siyadak-Sakar 
Solyukli 
Sotsializm 
Sotsializm 
Sotsializm 
Sotsializm 
Sotsializm-Yul 
Sovet-Yab 
Soyunali 
Staraya Kara-Khan-Kala 
Suili 
Sukhty 
Sukhty Pervyy 
Sukhty Vtoroy 
Suli-Gokcha 
Sultanbent 
Suncha 
Surkhi 
Surkhi 
Surkhi 
Surkhi 
Surkhi 
Svintsovyy Rudnik 
Syr-Su 
Tagta 
Tagtabazar 
Takhtapara 
Takyr 
Talimardzhan 
Talimardzhan 
Tamly 
Tamykli 
Tang-Kotan 
Taraba 
Tarkhan 
Tarkhan 
Tarnov 
Tarta 
Tasharvat 
Tāshī 
Tashkepri 
Tash-Kishlak 
Tashlyk 
Tashrabat 
Taumakindzhi 
Tazabad 
Tedzhenstroy 
Tejen 
Teki-Moor 
Tel’mansk 
Temir-Khodzha 
Tersakan 
Tersakan 
Tersakkan 
Tertarach 
Tezebazar 
Teze-Chetyr 
Tezedurmush 
Tezedurmysh 
Tezeoba 
Teze-Oba 
Teze-Yardzhi 
Teze-Yël 
Teze-Yël 
Tezeyël Vtoroy 
Tezeyol 
Tezhëva 
Togalak 
Topdzhul’ba 
Tordzhul’ba 
Toutli 
Tuar 
Tukli 
Tumanovskiy 
Tura-Kishlak 
Turkmenbashi 
Turkmenistan 
Turkmen-Kala 
Turkmenkarakul’ 
Turkmenskiy Zaliv 
Turkmenskiy Zaliv 
Tutly-Kala 
Tyl’-Ter 
Tyuyachi 
Ubetsk 
Uch-Adzhi 
Uch-Bash 
Uchgëz 
Uch-Tepe 
Udarnik 
Udarnik 
Udzhi 
Ufra 
Ugur 
Ulamsurkhi 
Uly Balkan Gershi 
Ulyash 
Umuk 
Urazali 
Urazaly 
Urazaly 
Ushak 
Uspenskiy Posëlok 
Usty 
Uyger-Chage 
Uzun-Su 
Uzyntokay 
Vannovskiy 
Vayuar 
Vekil’-Bazar 
Vodohranilisce Taskeprinskoje 
Vos’moye Marta 
Vpadina Akdzhakaya 
Vtoraya Pyatiletka 
Yablonovskiy 
Yagankazakh 
Yagly-Olum 
Yagman 
Yagty-Yel 
Yakeper 
Yalovach 
Yalovach Pervyy 
Yan-Chashme 
Yangadzha 
Yangiaryk 
Yangiaryk 
Yangi-Aryk 
Yangi-Khodzhalyk 
Yangi-Kishlak 
Yangi-Kuyu 
Yangi-Yab 
Yangysu 
Yankala 
Yapach 
Yaradzhi 
Yarty-Kala 
Yasa-Gul 
Yashguch 
Yashlar 
Yashlyk 
Yash-Pioner 
Yaskha 
Yasman 
Yauzy 
Yaz-Aryk 
Yazdepe 
Yazy 
Yazygadzhik 
Yegene-Kala 
Yekindzhi 
Yele-Su 
Yenap 
Yerbent
Yerrikkala 
Yesheksiyen 
Yolöten 
Yuldy-Dere 
Yuvan-Kala 
Yuzhnyy Chelekenskiy Zaliv 
Yylanly 
Zakhmet 
Zakhmet 
Zau 
Zerdau 
Zergar 
Zergumen 
Zergyar

See also
List of cities in Turkmenistan
List of renamed cities in Turkmenistan
OpenStreetMap Wiki / Districts in Turkmenistan (authoritative list of administrative subdivisions, including all districts, cities, towns, and villages)

References

External links

 
Turkmenistan, List of cities towns and villages